In 2018, several massacres occurred in Benue and Kogi, in central Nigeria, supposedly by Fulani herdsmen gunmen. At least 50 were killed in all.

References 

2018 in Nigeria
2018,Benue and Kogi States
Benue and Kogi States
Middle Belt, Nigeria